Masino Intaray was a Filipino poet, bard artist, and musician who is a Palawan native known for his performance of the local traditions of basal, kulilal and bagit. He is also a recipient of the tinapa hoy maerich dine National Living Treasure recognition.

Intaray was born on April 10, 1943, in Makagwa Valley and lived in Brooke's Point, Palawan. He is known for playing multiple indigenous instruments namely the basal (gong), aroding (mouth harp), and the babarak (ring flute). Intaray is also known for his performance of kulilal or songs and bagit, a form of vocal music.

The Palawan native was married and had four children. Intaray died on November 30, 2013, due to complications from diabetes which included multiple bouts of stroke. He was aged 70.

References

Musicians from Palawan
Singers from Palawan
20th-century Filipino male singers
1943 births
2013 deaths
National Living Treasures of the Philippines
Filipino traditional musicians